Franekeradeel is a former municipality in the northern Netherlands. It was created in 1984 by combining an earlier Franekeradeel municipality with the city of Franeker and parts of the former municipality of Barradeel. On 1 January 2018 it merged with the municipalities of het Bildt, Menameradiel and parts of Littenseradiel to form the new municipality Waadhoeke.

Population centres 
Achlum, Boer, Dongjum, Firdgum, Franeker, Herbaijum, Hitzum, Klooster-Lidlum, Oosterbierum, Peins, Pietersbierum, Ried, Schalsum, Sexbierum, Tzum, Tzummarum, Zweins.

Topography

Dutch Topographic map of the former municipality of Franekeradeel, June 2015

References

External links

Official website

Waadhoeke
Former municipalities of Friesland
1984 establishments in the Netherlands
States and territories established in 1984
Municipalities of the Netherlands disestablished in 2018